Johanne Defay (19 November 1993) is a French professional surfer. She was born in Le Puy-en-Velay, Auvergne, France.

She began surfing at the age of 8 off the beaches of Reunion Island, which is her home today. After Johanne's first competition when she was only ten years old, she quickly moved through the European amateur ranks to eventually take on the WSL World Qualifying Series. In 2008 Defay almost gave up competing. She was finding it difficult to transition from the juniors to the WQS and then the economy crashed causing many surf companies cancel their sponsorships. At that time, Johanne found herself without sponsors and also without decent results. However, with her parents’ encouragement, Johanne was able to qualify for the World Championship Tour within two years.

She has won five World Surf League events, the Vans US Open of Surfing 2015, the Fiji Women's Pro 2016, Uluwatu CT 2018, the Jeep Surf Ranch Pro 2021 and the Quiksilver/ROXY Pro G-Land 2022.

Competitive highlights
 2016 WSL 2016 Rank: 5
 2016 1st Fiji Women's Pro – Fiji
 2016 3rd Roxy Pro Gold Coast – Australia
 2015 8th World Championship Tour
 2015 3rd Fiji Women's Pro – Fiji
 2015 5th Rip Curl Pro Bell's Beach – Australia
 2015 1st Vans US Open of Surfing – California
 2015 5th Cascais Women's Pro – Portugal
 2015 5th Roxy Pro – France
 2014 ROOKIE OF THE YEAR – 8th on Final Ranking
 2014 3rd Swatch Women's Pro – California
 2014 3rd Roxy Pro – France
 2014 5th Fiji Women's Pro – Fiji
 2014 5th Vans US Open of Surfing – California
 2014 5th Cascais Women's Pro – Portugal
 2014 5th Target Maui Pro – Hawaii
 2013 3rd Junior World Championship Florianopolis – Brazil
 2013 1st France Champion Brétignolles sur Mer – France
 2013 1st Pontevedra Junior Pro Surf – Spain
 2013 Open European Champion
 2013 Junior European Champion
 2013 Finalist of the 6 stars WQS Swatch Girls Pro – France
 2013 1st Swatch Girls Junior Pro – France
 2013 1st Soöruz Junior Pro – France
 2013 1st Gijòn Junior Pro – Spain
 2013 2nd O’Neil Junior Pro – Spain
 2013 1st Soöruz Junior Pro – France
 2013 4th Coupe de France – France

WSL World Championship Tour

References

External links
Profile in World Surf League
Personal Site

1993 births
Emlyon Business School alumni
Living people
French surfers
People from Le Puy-en-Velay
World Surf League surfers
Sportspeople from Haute-Loire
Olympic surfers of France
Surfers at the 2020 Summer Olympics
Sportspeople from Réunion
French female surfers